PMVE may refer to:

Poly(methyl vinyl ether), a polymer of methyl vinyl ether
Perfluoromethylvinylether, a monomer used to make some fluoroelastomers
Politically Motivated Violent Extremism, encourages the use of violence to establish new political systems, or new structures and norms within existing systems.